The 2017 Levene Gouldin & Thompson Tennis Challenger was a professional tennis tournament played on hard court. It was the 24th edition of the tournament which was part of the 2017 ATP Challenger Tour. It took place in Binghamton, United States between 24 and 30 July 2017.

Singles main-draw entrants

Seeds

 1 Rankings are as of July 17, 2017.

Other entrants
The following players received wildcards into the singles main draw:
  JC Aragone
  William Blumberg
  Brandon Holt
  Alex Rybakov

The following player received entry into the singles main draw using a protected ranking:
  Kevin King

The following player received entry into the singles main draw as an alternate:
  Edward Corrie

The following players received entry from the qualifying draw:
  Dekel Bar
  Adam El Mihdawy
  Eric Quigley
  Evan Song

The following player received entry as a lucky loser:
  Connor Farren

Champions

Singles 

  Cameron Norrie def.  Jordan Thompson 6–4, 0–6, 6–4.

Doubles 

  Denis Kudla /  Daniel Nguyen def.  Jarryd Chaplin /  Luke Saville 6–3, 7–6(7–5).

External links
Official Website

 
2017 ATP Challenger Tour
2017
2017 in American tennis
2017 in sports in New York (state)
July 2017 sports events in the United States